Seyed Hamed Solhipour Avanji (born 22 May 1989) is an Iranian Paralympic powerlifter and the World Champion in the 97Kg.

He has received two gold medals in the 2014 Incheon and 2018 Jakarta Asian Para Games.

Beginnings 

Solhipour started his sport activities at 15. At first, he experienced bodybuilding. In 2007, became a member of I.R. Iran National Para Powerlifting and attended in the 2008 USA Junior World Championships. In his first participation, he received a silver medal.

Para powerlifting records 
 He improved his World record 14 kg in the 2010 Malaysia Open Championships by the lift of 220 kg in the men's up to 90 kg and again remained Junior World record holder.
 He lifted 229.5 kg in the 2014 Incheon Para Asian Games in the men's up to 88 category and break the para Asian and world record.
 He lifted 234 kg in the 2018 Jakarta Para Asian Games in the men's up to 97 kg category and 1 kg improved the para Asian record.
 He lifted 235 kg in the 2019 Nur-Sultan World Championships in the men's up to 97 kg category and one kg improved his para Asian record in the 2018 Jakarta.

Medals 
 1st Place of Malaysia World Games in the youth category-2010
 1st Place of Libya International Games in youth category-2010
 1st Place of Libya International Games in adults category-2010
 1st place of Jordan World Games in youth category-2011
 1st Place of Jordan World Games in adults category-2011
 1st place of IWAS2001 World Games, Emirates
 1st Place of Malaysia World Games 2012
 1st place of incheon Asian Para Games South Korea 2014
 1st Place of Fazza International Championships Emirates 2016
 1st Place of Asian Championships Japan 2018
 1st Place of Jakarta Asian Para Games Indonesia 2018
 1st Place of World Championships Games Kazakhstan 2019
1st Place of World Para Powerlifting World Cup Thailand 2021
 2nd Place of Asian Para Games Guangzhou 2010
 2nd Place of USA World Games in the youth category 2008
 2nd Place of World Championships Games Dubai 2014 Emirates
 2nd place of Asia Almaty Championship Kazakhstan 2015
 2nd Place of Almaty Free Championships Kazakhstan 2015
 2nd Place of World Championships Kazakhstan 2015
 3rd Place of World Games 2011 Emirates Sharjah
 3rd Place of Asia Championships Malaysia 2013
 4th place of Paraolampic Games London 2012
 Attendance in Paraolampic Games rio 2016 Brazil

References 

1989 births
Living people
People from Tehran
Paralympic powerlifters of Iran
Iranian male weightlifters
Powerlifters at the 2012 Summer Paralympics
Powerlifters at the 2016 Summer Paralympics
20th-century Iranian people
21st-century Iranian people